Bielawa is a town in Dzierżoniów County, Lower Silesian Voivodeship, in south-west Poland.

Bielawa may also refer to the following places in Poland:
 Bielawa, Wrocław County in Lower Silesian Voivodeship (south-west Poland)
 Bielawa, Greater Poland Voivodeship (west-central Poland)
 Bielawa, Masovian Voivodeship (east-central Poland)

Bielawa can be a Surname
 Herbert Bielawa, American composer and professor of music
 Lisa Bielawa, American composer and vocalist

See also
 Bielawa Dolna
 Bielawa Górna
 Bielawy (disambiguation)